Félix-Albert Pel (12 June 1849 – 9 June 1924) was a French serial killer. He was nicknamed The Watchmaker of Montreuil.

At Landru's trial, the latter was compared to Pel because of the many similarities between the two cases.

Youth 
Born in Grand-Coeur, in the municipality of Aigueblanche, Albert Pel was the son of a watchmaker and a merchant; his parents separated shortly after his birth, apparently because of adulterous acts committed by his mother. In this regard, Pel said during his trial he suffered from "insecurities if he really was the child of the Savoie watchmaker". Each spouse lived on his side: Mr. Pel remained in Bourg-Saint-Maurice, and Ms. Pel moved to Paris. She was remembered for her modest trade of religious objects on Sainte-Croix-de-la-Bretonnerie street. The child was raised by his father and then collected by one of his uncles.

In 1859, an uncle who was interested in Albert Pel, master Flandin, a lawyer at Moûtiers, proposed to send him to Paris to finish his education and make his apprenticeship. Pel therefore resided mainly with his mother, who entrusted the boy first to the sisters of Saint Augustine, then to the brothers of Saint Nicolas, Vaugirard.

At the age of fifteen, he entered MM. Leriel and Maucolin, and in 1868, he went out to become a worker, in the Manceau timepiece, first on 17th Rue La Fayette, then in the Josse house, 13th Rue De Douai. Albert Pel still lived with his mother, on rue Bleue. When business did not prosper, they moved to Rochechouart street in the middle of 1869, where Pel opened a watch business. Miss Reichenbach, a neighbor of the Pels, testified during the trial of the lack of sympathy of Pel had for his mother.

First murder 
In the early days of August 1872, Ms. Pel was seized with severe colic. The doctor visited her only once, finding pain in the abdomen and stomach, and obstructions of the airways. On 26 August, she died without her son being badly affected. According to witnesses, he even exclaimed: "She is there!" The death certificate will note as cause of death "chronic bronchitis". Pel insisted that no one came to watch the body, nor to witness the burial. The neighbours supposed that the strange noises that they heard that day were the work of Pel, seeking to discover hidden valuables in the house.

In 1873, it was his father's turn to die in Bourg Saint-Maurice. Albert Pel, not having moved from Paris, seemed totally alienated to this death. He collected the inheritance, about 25,000 francs. The investigation noted that for the occasion, Pel wore a red ribbon at his buttonhole, which intrigued the people attending the funeral. When asked, he would answer:

First signs of psychic disorders 
Pel moved a lot. From 1872 to 1874, He lived in different neighborhoods where he sometimes presented himself as a mathematics teacher at Lycée Saint-Louis, sometimes as a professor of rhetoric, sometimes as an organist of the Sainte-Trinité, decorating himself with decorations he had no right to use. He would also tell a fellow student, Mr. Hubert, about the death of his mother, that she was struck down with an induction coil that he had in his possession.

In July 1874, he moved to Passy, Raynouard Street. His excellent behaviour, his seriousness, his assiduousness of the pusher had won him public attention, when, in October 1877, an unfortunate event occurred. A creditor, Mr. Serin, apparently particularly discourteous, claimed the payment of a debt of 2,000 francs. Pel began by responding with threatening letters, then one day went to his opponent's home to shoot him. Disarmed and taken to the Police Commissioner, Pel was detained. Divagging, he was quickly taken to the infirmary, where he was examined, and recognized as delusional. He was placed at Sainte-Anne, where he remained a month under observation. When he was released, the specialists declared him radically cured; he settled with the creditor.

First disappearance 
Returning to Paris, he successively opened a pastry shop, an advertising agency, then became a director and a sponsor of the Théâtre des Délassements-Comiques. In 1878, he moved to Doudeauville Street, where he used the name of Cuvillier, with the agreement of Mrs. Cuvillier, to protect himself from his creditors. In May 1879, he moved to Ternes, Doisy Street, in an apartment where he now dealt only with physics and chemistry; he then gives himself the title of physician.

With him lived two women: Marie Mahoin, his servant, and Eugénie Meyer, his mistress, seamstress in her fifties, who used to mend costumes at the Odéon-Théâtre de l'Europe. Two months later, Meyer and Mahoin were both suddenly sick with vomiting and diarrhea; they complained, moreover, of an unquenchable thirst.  Meyer had fallen ill first; the servant had treated her for some time; then, very suffering herself, between 19 July 1880 at Beaujon Hospital. Eight days were enough to restore her health, but in the meantime, Meyer went missing. Since the departure of his servant, Pel lived as a recluse in his home, passing his mail through a fanlight. Miss Mahoin, wishing to resume her service for Pel. The now-odd looking man refused to let her enter his home, and as she wanted to at least take away the trunk she had left when she left, he closed the door, asked for her to wait a few minutes, then gave to her the effects she had asked for. A first judicial inquiry was opened to investigate the disturbing disappearance of Eugenie. Pel was the main suspect of the investigation, but due to lack of serious evidence, he benefited from a non-suit order. Pel then came to live on Avenue Kléber where he began to practice the watchmaking profession.

Second wave of deaths

First marriage 
On 26 August 1880, Pel married a young girl named Eugénie Buffereau, a saleswoman employed by a merchant on the Avenue d'Eylau (now Avenue Victor-Hugo), who brought him a dowry of about 4,000 francs. A month later, the young woman suffered from constant vomiting and complained of a burning thirst.

On 21 October, Bufferau's mother visited her with a beautiful girl, following a note she received from her own daughter, saying: "Come quickly if you want to see me again alive! " Bufferau wanted to eat at the table, but could barely stand up, and vomited a lot. A doctor, Dr. Raoult, was called: he first believed that it was poisoning by fungi, then concluded it was acute gastroenteritis. She died on October 24, 1880, in the total indifference of her husband. Her family, scandalized, thought to seize the Justice before being changed, for fear of a scandal. In 1884, when the watchmaker was arrested, Bufferau's corpse was exhumed, and her remains were examined by the experts: there was a significant quantity of arsenic. Pel argued that his wife was taking Fowler's solution.

Second marriage 
Pel ran away again in 1881, and remained on Dôme Street, Passy. He wooed for a few weeks Miss Angèle Dufaure Murat-Bellisle, whom he had employed for some time as an apprentice. The union materialized, but the beautiful family, wary, wanted to establish a marriage contract, to protect the dowry of about 5,000 francs. Pel, fiercely opposed, consented after the ceremony to establish a will under which, in case of death, he bequeathed his property to his widow, but only if his wife and his mother do the same for his benefit.

After the wedding, the Pel couple, accompanied by Mrs. Dufaure-Murat, decided to settle in Nanterre. Pel went back to studying poisons, while continuing his watchmaking profession. He develops a certain Philloxericide of Dr. Pel, supposedly destined to revolutionize the regions of vineyards. In addition, he obtained authorization from the Paris Police Prefecture to sell poisonous substances and chemicals. Mrs Dufaure-Murat did not take long to begin suffering from violent colics. Frightened by the large amount of dangerous substances in the house to which she attributed her indisposition, she eventually moved to Paris, leaving the young couple alone. In April, Pel's wife, pregnant (she would give birth a few weeks before the trial), abandoned him for the nascent relationship he had with Élise Boehmer, a servant of forty years who repaired watches.

In Montreuil 
On 21 June 1884, Pel and Élise Boehmer moved to Montreuil-sous-Bois, 9th l'Église Street. On 2 July, Boehmer fell sick, suffering from colic and vomiting that caused her intolerable suffering. Two neighbors came to provide daily care until July 12, when Pel moved to the bedside. The patient's pulse disappeared in the evening, and never gave further signs of life. During the night, it was reported by several witnesses that Pel had masked the windows with black fabrics and carpets; others complained of the terrible smell that came from the kitchen and attest to having seen the watchmaker light large fires in an oven, which only went out at sunrise. The prosecutor's office, after a summary investigation, suspected him of cremating his girlfriend and ordered for his arrest. Pel defended himself: according to him, Élise Boehmer, feeling much better, left him on July 13, with a coachman that he would have gone himself to look for more than five kilometers, Faubourg Saint-Antoine. After police investigation, Albert Pel was accused of seven poisonings and was sent back to the cour d'assises.

Trial 
Pel appeared on 11 June 1885 before the Assizes Court of Seine. The trial, chaired by Mr. Councilor Dubard, lasted three days. The indictment noted seven poisonings over ten years, but only two were pursued (those of Eugénie Buffereau and Élise Boehmer). Albert Pel repelled all charges. He pleaded innocent and was defended by a young lawyer who has been appointed ex officio, Mr. Joly, a trainee lawyer.

Pel, aged 36 at the time of his conviction, was, according to the newspapers of the time of average height and puny appearance; his face, very peculiar, had as much marked the spirits of the time as the originality of his crimes. Very intelligent, he had black hair, lying back; his face was thin and yellowish; had extraordinarily prominent cheekbones; his eyes were sheltered behind gold glasses; he had a long, pointed nose; his lips were thin and discolored, and he had a black mustache and goatee. During both trials, he appeared dressed in black and wearing a white headscarf. His nonchalance, often noted by the journalists, contrasted with the seriousness of the accusations against him. Until the end, he proclaimed his innocence.

Throughout the trial, the Crown, in the person of Advocate General Bernard, highlighted Pel's greed. All the victims had the same symptoms: epigastric pain, choking, nausea, burning sensation in the digestive system, bowel problems, diarrhea, rapid debilitation, spasms, slow agony: the various characters, very clearly marked, of the intoxication with arsenic. No less than fifty witnesses, including experts, explained how he could have dismembered and destroyed the remains of Élise Boehmer, according to them, in the back shop of Montreuil. In forty hours, the furnace transported to the morgue would have destroyed even the last vestige of a human body. With regard to the prosecution evidence, one retained ashes, found in quantity in Pel; a saw, stained with blood and greasy matter; a hatchet and a kitchen knife covered with suspicious stains; a cast iron stove suspected of being used to cremate the dead bodies; a book of chemicals, and another one dealing with poisons, as well as a staggering amount of chemicals of all kinds.

On 13 June 1885, after three quarters of an hour of deliberation, the jurors found Pel not guilty of the poisoning of Eugénie Buffereau, but guilty of the murder of Élise Boehmer. Albert Pel, 36, was sentenced to death. However, following a defect of form (one of the jurors was bankrupt and not rehabilitated) brought the cassation of the judgment and the return to the cour d'assises of Melun. The benefit of the acquittal for the poisoning of Ms. Buffereau remained with him, only the question of the death of Elise Boehmer remained to be debated. On 14 August, the jury of Seine-et-Marne found Pel guilty of having poisoned Boehmer, but granted him the benefit of extenuating circumstances; Pel was sentenced to penal labour in perpetuity and would serve his sentence at the prison of New Caledonia in Bourail.

He died there on 9 June 1924, three days before his seventy-fifth birthday, which made him the oldest convict in France.

See also
 List of French serial killers

Bibliography

TV documentaries 

 The Mysterious Affair of the Watchmaker Pel, telefilm directed by Pierre Nivollet and broadcast on 28 February 1961 as part of the programme En your soul and conscience.

References

External links 

 Collections of the Lyon Public Library
 criminocorpus.cnrs.fr, p. 357

1849 births
1924 deaths
French serial killers
Male serial killers
Matricides
Murder in France
Patricides
Penal labour
Poisoners
Serial killers who died in prison custody
Uxoricides